Xanthorrhoea concava is a species of grasstree native to New South Wales, Australia.

Description
X. concava has no discernible trunk, though it branches below ground and may have multiple crowns.

Distribution and habitat
This grasstree occurs in south-eastern New South Wales, from the Sydney region southwards to Eden, often on seasonally waterlogged sites.

References

 

Asparagales of Australia
concava
Flora of New South Wales
Plants described in 1966